Pomacea paludosa, common name the Florida applesnail, is a species of freshwater snail with an operculum, an aquatic gastropod mollusk in the family Ampullariidae, the apple snails.

Shell description 

This species is the largest freshwater gastropod native to North America.

The shell is globose in shape. The whorls are wide, the spire is depressed, and the aperture is narrowly oval. The shells are brown in color, and have a pattern of stripes.

The shell is 60 mm in both length and width.

Distribution 
The indigenous distribution of this snail is central and southern Florida, Cuba and Hispaniola.

The nonindigenous distribution includes northern Florida. The species has also been found in Georgia, Oahu, Hawaii (Devick 1991),  Louisiana, and Oklahoma.

Ecology 

This is a tropical species. It is amphibious, and can survive in water bodies that dry out during the dry season.

Applesnails have both gills and lungs.

References 

  Applesnails of Florida Pomacea spp. (Gastropoda: Ampullariidae) <https://www.egovlink.com/public_documents300/winterhaven/published_documents/Winter%20Haven/Lakes/Backyard%20Wildlife/Animal%20Information/Snails%20and%20Slugs/Applesnails%20of%20Florida%20IN59800.pdf>

This article incorporates public domain text from:
 A. Benson. 2008. Pomacea paludosa. USGS Nonindigenous Aquatic Species Database, Gainesville, FL. <https://nas.er.usgs.gov/queries/FactSheet.asp?speciesID=985> Revision Date: 4/24/2006

Further reading 
 McClary, A. 1962. Surface inspiration and ciliary feeding in Pomacea paludosa (Prosobranchia: Mesogastropoda: Ampullariidae). Malacologia, 2(1): 87-104.
 Philip C. Darby, Robert E. Bennetts, Jason D. Croop, Patricia L. Valentine-Darby and Wiley M. Kitchens A Comparison of Sampling Techniques for Quantifying Abundance of the Florida Apple Snail (Pomacea Paludosa Say). J. Moll. Stud. (1999), 65, 195-208.
 Philip C. Darby, Patricia L. Valentine-Darby, H. Franklin Percival & Wiley M. Kitchens. Collecting Florida applesnails (Pomacea paludosa) from wetland habitats using funnel traps. Wetlands. Volume 21, Issue 2 (June 2001): 308–311.
 Robert B.E. Shuford III, Paul V. McCormick & Jennifer Magson. Habitat related growth of juvenile Florida applesnails (Pomacea paludosa). Florida Scientist. Volume 68, Issue 1 (March 2005): 11–19.
 Bruce Sharfstein & Alan D. Steinman. Growth and survival of the Florida apple snail (Pomacea paludosa) fed 3 naturally occurring macrophyte assemblages. Journal of the North American Benthological Society, Volume 20, Issue 1 (March 2001): 84–95.
 Posch H., Garr A. L. & Reynolds E. (2013). "The presence of an exotic snail, Pomacea maculata, inhibits growth of juvenile Florida apple snails, Pomacea paludosa". Journal of Molluscan Studies 79(4): 383-385. .
Applesnails of Florida on the UF / IFAS Featured Creatures Web site
 The applesnails of Florida
 Apple Snail Habitat Suitability Index
 https://web.archive.org/web/20060923125401/http://nis.gsmfc.org/nis_factsheet.php?toc_id=155
 http://www.applesnail.net/content/species/pomacea_paludosa.htm

paludosa
Gastropods described in 1829